Phractura is a genus of loach catfishes (order Siluriformes) that occur in Africa.

Phractura species are elongated fish with a long caudal peduncle and bony scutes on the sides, back, and belly., this feature giving the genus its name from the Greek phraktos, which means enclosed and oura which means tail. Phractura species are often associated with vegetation. The genus was originally given the name Peltura but this name was preoccupied by a genus of trilobites which the name Peltura had been applied to by Louis Agassiz in 1846. Phractura species, like other genera in Doumeinae, have a mouth modified into a suckermouth that allows it to clean to the objects and scrape the surface of the substrate.

Species
There are currently 13 recognized species in this genus:

 Phractura ansorgii Boulenger, 1902 (African whiptailed catfish)
 Phractura bovei Perugia, 1892
 Phractura brevicauda Boulenger, 1911
 Phractura clauseni Daget & Stauch, 1963
 Phractura fasciata Boulenger, 1920
 Phractura gladysae Pellegrin, 1931
 Phractura intermedia Boulenger, 1911
 Phractura lindica Boulenger, 1902
 Phractura longicauda Boulenger, 1903
 Phractura macrura Poll, 1967
 Phractura scaphyrhynchura Vaillant, 1886
 Phractura stiassny Skelton, 2007
Phractura tenuicauda Boulenger, 1902

References

 
Fish of Africa
Catfish genera
Taxa named by George Albert Boulenger
Freshwater fish genera